"Make Luv" is a song by Italian music producer Room 5 (also known as Junior Jack) featuring the sampled voice of American R&B singer Oliver Cheatham from his 1983 hit "Get Down Saturday Night". Released in March 2003, "Make Luv" reached  1 on the UK Singles Chart, where it remained for four weeks in March and April 2003. The song also reached the top 10 in Denmark, Greece, Ireland, Italy, the Netherlands, and Romania.

The song's success was partly due to its use in a popular television advertising campaign for Lynx Pulse deodorant. The duo released another collaboration, "Music and You" in 2003, which reached No. 38 on the UK Singles Chart.

Track listings

Italian CD single
 "Make Luv" (radio version) – 3:30
 "Make Luv" (JJ's dub edit) – 6:09
 "Make Luv" (extended mix) – 5:51
 "Make Luv" (Axwell dub mix) – 7:22
 "Make Luv" (Doublefunk remix) – 6:10
 "Make Luv" (Axwell remix) – 7:22

European CD single
 "Make Luv" (radio version) – 3:30
 "Make Luv" (JJ's dub edit) – 6:09

European maxi-CD single
 "Make Luv" (radio version) – 3:30
 "Make Luv" (Axwell remix) – 7:22
 "Make Luv" (JJ's dub edit) – 6:09
 "Make Luv" (Doublefunk remix) – 5:50

UK and Australasian CD single, UK cassette single
 "Make Luv" (radio version) – 3:30
 "Make Luv" (extended mix) – 5:51
 "Make Luv" (Axwell remix) – 7:22

UK 12-inch single
A1. "Make Luv" (extended mix) – 5:51
A2. "Make Luv" (JJ's dub edit) – 6:18
B1. "Make Luv" (Axwell remix) – 7:22

Canadian CD single
 "Make Luv" (radio version) – 3:30
 "Make Luv" (extended mix) – 5:51

Charts

Weekly charts

Year-end charts

Certifications

Release history

References

2003 songs
2003 debut singles
Oliver Cheatham songs
Number-one singles in Scotland
PIAS Recordings singles
Positiva Records singles
UK Singles Chart number-one singles